Peter Carravetta (born 10 May 1951 in Lappano) is an Italian philosopher, poet, literary theorist and translator.

Works
 The Elusive Hermes. Method, Discourse, Interpreting (Davies Group Publishing, 2013) 
 Existenz (Adams Press, 1976)
 delle voci (Anterem, 1980)
 The Sun and Other Things (Guernica, 1998)
 Linfinito (Campanotto, 2013)
 (2012) Weak Thought, Gianni Vattimo, Translated by Peter Carravetta, SUNY series in Contemporary Italian Philosophy, 2012 Translation of Il pensiero debole, Feltrinelli, Milano, 1983

See also
Deconstruction
Postmodern Christianity
Nihilism

References

External links 
 Carravetta's Personal Website
 Italian American Interviews. Peter Carravetta in Lappano

1951 births
20th-century essayists
20th-century Italian non-fiction writers
20th-century Italian philosophers
20th-century translators
21st-century essayists
21st-century Italian non-fiction writers
21st-century Italian philosophers
21st-century translators
City College of New York alumni
Continental philosophers
Death of God theologians
Heidegger scholars
Hermeneutists
Italian–English translators
Italian essayists
Italian literary critics
Italian male non-fiction writers
Italian philosophers
Italian poets
Italian translators
Literary theorists
Living people
Marxist theorists
Nietzsche scholars
People from Lappano
People of Calabrian descent
Philosophers of literature
Philosophers of nihilism
Philosophers of religion
Philosophy academics
Philosophy writers
Stony Brook University faculty
University of Bologna alumni
University of Chicago alumni
Writers about communism